The 1970 Asian Games medal table is a list of nations ranked by the medals won by their athletes during the multi-sport event, being held in Bangkok, Thailand from December 9, 1970, to December 20, 1970. The National Olympic Committees are ranked by number of gold medals first, with number of silver then bronze medals acting as the rank decider in the event of equal standing. Other alternative methods of ranking include listing by total medals.

Medal table

References

Medal table
1970